The Subaru Justy is a subcompact hatchback that has been sold by Japanese automobile manufacturer Subaru since 1984. Subaru manufactured the Justy from 1984 to 1994; since then it has sold rebadged versions of other vehicles under the Justy nameplate. The company introduced the latest iteration, a rebadged Daihatsu Boon (second generation), at the 2007 Frankfurt Motor Show with a 1.0 or 1.2-liter straight-three engine, front/four wheel drive, electronically controlled continuously variable transaxle, or a 5-speed manual transaxle. For the 2010 model year, the Justy was replaced with the Subaru Trezia. The Justy nameplate was revived in November 2016 as a rebadged Toyota Tank and its twin counterpart the Toyota Roomy and Daihatsu Thor.



First generation

Originally designed and manufactured in Japan, the Justy was introduced to Japan in 1984. The design was a widened and stretched version of the Rex kei car, still using the same doors and some other pressings. To Japanese buyers, it was longer and wider and had an engine larger than kei car dimension regulations outlined, while keeping the engine displacement just under 1000 cc to minimize the annual road tax obligation. The electronically controlled, continuously variable "ECVT" transmission was introduced in February 1987. Production of this model was limited to 500 per month due to limited supplies of steel bands from Van Doorne transmission, but as the Justy ECVT was not an unqualified success this was not a real problem. When supplies later increased, Subaru chose to use them for the smaller Rex instead. The Justy was originally available with a low or a high roof, although the flat roofed version was eventually allowed to wither away.

European and American versions followed in 1987 and all models received a restyling in 1989. In some countries, such as Sweden, the Justy was sold under the name Subaru Trendy. In some places it was also simply marketed as the 'J-series' in early years, J10 for 1.0 L versions and J12 for the later 1.2 L versions. In many markets the Justy was only sold with four-wheel-drive, as with much of the Subaru lineup. Intended to compete with Daihatsu's one-liter Charade, the Justy was presented with a one-liter engine. Somewhat underpowered, this was later complemented by a larger 1.2-liter which eventually became the only engine installed. In European catalyzed trim, this engine offered  at 5200 rpm.

In Taiwan, Subaru marketed a version of the Justy with a sedan-style body and an uprated  fuel injected EF12 engine called the Tutto. Taiwanese Subarus were assembled by their local partner Ta Ching.

United States
In the United States, only the Japanese manufactured models were sold and only from 1987 to 1994 with the 1.2 engine. Early models were all low-roof, a full switchover to the high roof came with the midcycle facelift for 1989. The Justy received 4WD as an option in 1988, and all models were equipped with Multi Port Fuel Injection late in 1991. A five-door model was also available from 1990 to 1994. A 1995 model was offered in Canada.

Norway
The Subaru Justy (they were registered as "Justy/Trendy" in Norway) was available from late 1984 with optional 4×4 and the EF10 engine. The 4×4 version came with a  version of the engine with a two barrel carburetor, while the FWD version only produced  with a single barrel carburetor. Gear ratios were identical on the 1.0- and 1.2-liter versions. Stock tire dimensions on the 1.0-liter version where 145-SR-12 and the 1.2-liter version had 165-65-R-13.

Taiwan

Fuji Heavy Industries signed a long-term contract with Ta Ching Motor Co. in 1989 in Taiwan right after the Justy hatchback started production. Ta Ching Motor Co. later developed the Subaru Tutto notchback sedan unique to Taiwan based on the Justy hatchback.

Drivetrain
Initially, the Justy was equipped with a 1.0 or 1.2 liter EF three-cylinder engine and either a manual transmission or a continuously variable transmission with either front wheel drive or on-demand four wheel drive.  The CVT technology (a pushbelt system) was employed because with a conventional automatic transmission, performance would have been unacceptable due to the small 3-cylinder engine and due to driving conditions in Japan, where the speed limits realistically don't exceed  in urban areas, the Justy was an affordable choice. In North America, because of the long distances, the CVT was considered unreliable, but this has not been the case in other countries.

In 1989, the gear ratios changed, front brakes and outer axle shafts were made larger, the rear differential was reinforced and the front axle shafts were identical lengths thanks to an intermediate extension shaft.

The European Justy sold from 1994 to 2001 was a rebadged second generation Suzuki Cultus built in Hungary. It used a 1.3 SOHC 8V, G13BA Suzuki engine with a Suzuki 5-speed manual transmission and AWD via a viscous clutch as standard.

Gear ratios
1987–1988

1989–1994

Rebadged models
After 1994, rebadged models from other manufacturers carried the Justy nameplate:

 In 1994, Subaru introduced to the Europe market a rebadged second generation Suzuki Cultus carrying the Justy nameplate.  Manufactured at Suzuki's Esztergom, Hungary plant, these were available in 3 and 5 door models, both with full-time all wheel drive as standard.
 In 2004, a rebadged Suzuki Ignis carried the G3X Justy nameplate in Europe, this model is available with a Suzuki M13A or M15A engine, and also equipped as standard with AWD.
 In model year 2007 a rebadged Toyota Passo/Daihatsu Boon revived the Justy nameplate with the Toyota 1KR-FE 1.0 L engine. It was only available with front wheel drive, unlike previous Justy models since the first one in 1984 that had either optional or standard 4WD/AWD.
 In late 2016 a rebadged Toyota Roomy/Tank/Daihatsu Thor revived the Justy nameplate with the Toyota 1KR-FE 1.0 L engine.

References

1990s cars
2000s cars
2010s cars
All-wheel-drive vehicles
Cars introduced in 1984
Front-wheel-drive vehicles
Hatchbacks
OEM Suzuki vehicles
Justy
Subcompact cars
Vehicles with CVT transmission